Tilden is a Census-designated place (CDP) and county seat of McMullen County, Texas, United States.

Tilden lies at the intersection of State Highways 16 and 72 in the north central part of the county. It is located roughly an hour south of San Antonio.

History
During the Civil War, a Home Guard post named Camp Rio Frio was built to protect the community from Apaches and bandits.

After the war, the community was called Dog Town and was reputed to be a lawless and bandit-filled place.

The first establishment was the Franklin Ranch in 1868, built by Ralph S. Franklin.  Now the Lone Star Camp, it is a hunting and working ranch camp still owned by the Franklin Family.

In 1871, the community was granted a post office.

The town's name was changed in honor of Samuel J. Tilden, the unsuccessful Democratic presidential candidate in the 1876 United States presidential election.

In 1881, Old McMullin College opened under the direction of John Van Epps Covey, and endorsed by the Baptist Church.  The buildings were turned over to the Tilden School District in 1897.

Boot Hill Cemetery

Located in Tilden is Boot Hill Cemetery, one of the only two authentic cemeteries of its kind in the southwest. It was so named because many of those who were interred there died violently ("with their boots on"). Many of the early graves were those of people who were killed in accidents, murdered, or who died of cholera during an epidemic in 1869, although some were known to have died of natural causes.  The cemetery was established sometime after Frio Rio came into existence in 1858. It is currently located behind the bank half a block north of the courthouse plaza on Highway 72 and half a block east of State Highway 16, across from the new sheriff's office.

In 1877, Boot Hill Cemetery was abandoned in favor of the present Hill Top Cemetery and then neglected for more than half a century.  During this time a number of the markers deteriorated, fell down, and became lost, along with the local history they contained.  In 1955, when the Cenizo Garden Club was organized, its members began to clean up and restore the cemetery.  They cleaned the plots, cleared out the brush, and located as many graves as possible.  The grounds were enclosed by a low border of native stone and the Boot Hill Cemetery sign, a large boot made of masonry mounted on a large slab of petrified palm stump, was added to the cemetery grounds.  The club was also instrumental in obtaining a historical marker, which now stands at the entrance to the cemetery.

Demographics

2020 census
Note: the US Census treats Hispanic/Latino as an ethnic category. This table excludes Latinos from the racial categories and assigns them to a separate category. Hispanics/Latinos can be of any race. 

As of the 2020 United States census, there were 190 people, 72 households, and 56 families residing in the CDP.

Education
Public education in the community of Tilden is provided by the McMullen County Independent School District.

Notable people
 Lon Oden (1863–1910), was a Texas Ranger of the Old West, and a legend inside the Rangers.
 Bob Wheeler, member of Texas State Legislature from 1955 to 1961.

Climate
The climate in this area is characterized by hot, humid summers and generally mild to cool winters.  According to the Köppen Climate Classification system, Tilden has a humid subtropical climate, abbreviated "Cfa" on climate maps.

References

External links

Unincorporated communities in McMullen County, Texas
County seats in Texas
Unincorporated communities in Texas
Boot Hill cemeteries